Sweet & Sour is the second summer special album by South Korean girl group Sistar. It was released on August 26, 2014 by Starship Entertainment and distributed by LOEN Entertainment. "I Swear" served as the lead single for the album.

Track listing

Charts

Sales and certifications

Music program awards

References

2014 EPs
Korean-language EPs
Sistar EPs
Starship Entertainment EPs